Statistics of Russian Top League in season 1992.

Overview
Twenty clubs of the former Soviet competition took place in this season. The league was combined out of six clubs of the Soviet Top League, 11 - Soviet First League, and the rest out of the promoted from the Buffer League (Center and East). FC Spartak Moscow won the championship.

The composition of groups may seem kind of uneven with four Top League clubs in Group A and two — in Group B. However the seeding was done upon the completion of the previous Soviet season with Rotor being conditionally promoted to the top level.

First stage

Group A

Table

Results

Group B

Table

Results

Final stage
The results of games played in the first stage were counted in the final stage.

By political agreement with UEFA and Ukraine, Russia inherited the access right of Soviet Union to the European competitions, while Ukraine obtained part of the rights of disbanded East Germany.

Championship Round
Tournament for places 1 to 8

Table

Results

Relegation Round
Tournament for places 9 to 20

Table

Results

Top scorers
Gasimov was the official top scorer as Matveyev and Garin did not play in the Championship Round.

20 goals
 Yuri Matveyev (Uralmash)

16 goals
 Oleg Garin (Okean)
  Vali Gasimov (Dynamo Moscow)

13 goals
 Vladimir Kulik (Zenit)
 Kirill Rybakov (Asmaral)

12 goals
 Dmitri Radchenko (Spartak Moscow)
  Nazim Suleymanov (Spartak Vladikavkaz)

10 goals
 Rustyam Fakhrutdinov (Krylya Sovetov)
 Aleksandr Grishin (CSKA Moscow)
 Gennadi Grishin (Torpedo Moscow)
 Igor Lediakhov (Spartak Moscow)
 Oleg Veretennikov (Rotor)

Medal squads
(league appearances and goals listed in brackets)

See also
1992 Russian First League
1992 Russian Second League

References
Russia - List of final tables (RSSSF)

Russian Premier League seasons
1
Russia
Russia